The 1929–30 season was Stoke City's 30th season in the Football League and the tenth in the Second Division.

With the 1920s, which had seen Stoke hit the highs of the First Division and lows of the Third Division, coming to an end there was hope around the city that the club could regain its top-flight status. The Victoria Ground was improved again and could now hold 50,000. Despite a good start to the season with 15 points collected from the first 12 matches Stoke could not maintain a promotion challenge and finished in mid-table.

Season review

League
With the 1920s now drawing to a close there were high hopes that, after three seasons of reasonable success on the pitch, a return to the First Division could be imminent. Tom Mather was proving to be a fine manager, who with little or no resources, had built a team good enough to compete with the best in the country. The bad feeling surrounding the sale of Harry Davies was slowly receding and two new forwards emerged, Wilf Kirkham from Port Vale and Wilf Chadwick from Wolverhampton Wanderers.

The 1929–30 season was launched with a ceremony at the Victoria Ground which saw the Football League vice-president Mr C. Sutcliffe, officially declare open the new covered accommodation on the Butler Street stand for 12,000 spectators, bringing the overall number of fans under cover up to 20,000. At this time it was considered that the Victoria Ground was only second in the country to Liverpool's Anfield with the total capacity now at 50,000.

With Dick Williams still in goal and Bob McGrory and Billy Spencer at full back, Stoke started the season well and after twelve matches they lay second in the table. However Stoke could not maintain their challenge as they were robbed of key players through injury mainly McGrory whose leadership was sorely missed and in the end Stoke settled for a position in mid table.

FA Cup
Stoke suffered great misfortune in the FA Cup as in the third round they were leading Doncaster Rovers 3–2 up until 76 minutes when the match was called off due to heavy snow fall. In the 'replay' Doncaster won 1–0.

Final league table

Results
Stoke's score comes first

Legend

Football League Second Division

FA Cup

Squad statistics

References

Stoke City F.C. seasons
Stoke